Growth and Change: A Journal of Urban and Regional Policy is a quarterly peer-reviewed academic journal published by Wiley-Blackwell.  The journal was established in 1970.  Its current editors are John Carruthers (Cornell University), Natasha Duncan (Purdue University), Canfei He (Peking University), and Shengjun Zhu (Peking University).  The journal covers economics, geography, regional science, urban and regional planning, public finance, and rural sociology.  

According to the Journal Citation Reports, the journal has a two-year impact factor of 2.704 in 2021. According to the Scopus database the journal has a four-year CiteScore of 2.9 in 2021.

References

External links 
 

Wiley-Blackwell academic journals
English-language journals
Publications established in 1970
Development studies journals